Lavaloceras  is a genus of middle Ordivician discosorids included in the Westonoceratidae. The shell as nearly straight, with a slight exogastic curvature, and is rather short, breviconic.

According to Teichert, 1964, Lavaloceras is  more closely related to Westonoceras and Winnipegoceras than to Faberoceras which is thought to have given rise to the Lowoceratidae

References

 Curt Teichert, 1964. Nautiloidea - Discosorida; Treatise on Invertebrate Paleontology, Part K. Geological Society of America.
 Fossilworks Lavaloceras

Prehistoric nautiloid genera
Discosorida
Paleozoic life of Quebec